Funduq al-Najjarin (also spelled Fondouk (el-)Nejjarine) is a historic funduq (a caravanserai or traditional inn) in Fes el Bali, the old medina quarter in the city of Fez, Morocco. 

The funduq is situated in the heart of the medina, at Al-Najjarin Square (also: Nejjarine Square or Place Nejjarine), which is also notable for the Nejjarine Fountain, an attached saqayya or traditional public fountain. The building was designed for use by the merchants, traders, and visitors to the city of Fez and provided a storage place. It is a prominent example of Moroccan riad architecture. Today it houses a private museum, Le Musée Nejjarine des Arts et Métiers du Bois (Nejjarine Museum of Wooden Arts & Crafts).

History

The name al-Najjarin (or the French transliteration Nejjarine) means "carpenters", a reference to the historic presence of a carpenters' souq (market) around the square in front of the funduq today. The souq is believed to have existed since the Marinid era (1244-1465 CE).

The funduq was commissioned by the amin (provost or magistrate) 'Adiyil in 1711, under the reign of the Alaouite Sultan Ismail Ibn Sharif. Its attached saqayya (fountain) was commissioned in the 19th century by the Sultan Abd al-Rahman (ruled 1822–1859). Despite these developments from different dates, the various structures and the public square form an integrated whole in the local community. The building was originally used as a trading center, caravanserai (inn), and merchant warehouse associated closely with the Makhzen (the government or royal authorities). It likely continued to serve this function up until the beginning of the 20th century. Another funduq founded in the same year (1711), the Funduq Sagha in northern Fes el-Bali, also exhibits a very similar architecture and decorative style.

The funduq was classified as a national historic monument in 1916 and was used as a police station by the French colonial authority in the 1940s. The building was restored between 1990 and 1996, and on May 23, 1998, it was reopened as a private museum for wood arts and crafts known as Le Musée Nejjarine des Arts et Métiers du Bois.

Architecture

The funduq 
The building is built on an almost symmetrical rectangular plan. The interior is accessed through a monumental entrance leading to the lobby and the central courtyard or sahn. This gate, 5 meters tall and 3 meters wide, is framed by a facade of rich floral and geometrical decorations and inscriptions in stucco and tilework, and overlooked by an impressive carved cedar-wood canopy. The courtyard inside is rectangular and surrounded by a three-story gallery on all sides giving access to many different rooms. Rooms for the guests were located on the upper floors.

The fountain 
A saqayya is normally constructed as a part of the charity work and attached to the buildings such as mosque as an accessory (similar to a sabil in other parts of the Islamic world), but it constitutes an integral part of the structure for this funduq. The saqayya is placed in front of the building, facing the square. The water was used for drinking, especially for the guests of the hotel. It is enclosed by two columns and richly decorated by zellij, stucco, and its own carved wooden canopy.

References

Bibliography
Hillenbrand, Robert. Islamic Architecture. NY: Columbia UP, 1994. 240–251.
Pickens et al. Maroc: Les Cites Imperiales. Paris: ACR Edition. 1995.

17th-century establishments in Africa
Buildings and structures in Fez, Morocco
Museums in Morocco
Tourist attractions in Fez, Morocco
'Alawi architecture
Caravanserais in Morocco